Loyola Gymnasium Prizren is a private Catholic gymnasium boarding school, located in the city of Prizren, in the District of Prizren, Kosovo. 

The school was opened by German Jesuits in 2005, in the wake of the civil wars in the area. The school accepts equal numbers of girls and boys, from grade 6 through gymnasium. German is studied as a foreign language in preparation for the "German language Diploma of the Ministerial Conference of Education and Culture of Germany" (DSD).

See also

 Catholic Church in Kosovo
 Education in Kosovo
 List of Jesuit schools

Notes

References  

Educational institutions established in 2005
Religious buildings and structures in Prizren
Jesuit secondary schools in Kosovo
Education in Prizren
2005 establishments in Serbia
Schools in Prizren